Paul Nash may refer to:

 Paul Nash (artist) (1889–1946), British artist
 Paul Nash (athlete) (born 1947), South African sprinter
 Paul Nash (Australian swimmer) (born 1959), Australian swimmer
 Paul Nash (Jamaican swimmer) (born 1943), former Jamaican swimmer
 Paul Nash (musician) (1948-2005), American guitarist